Monona Grove High School (MGHS) is a school in Monona, Wisconsin, United States. Mitchal McGrath is the principal. The school was first established in 1955 to serve students from the city of Monona and the village and town of Cottage Grove and formerly served students from Town of Blooming Grove. The current building was constructed in 1999.

Demographics
Monona Grove is 85 percent white, five percent Hispanic, three percent Asian, three percent black, and three percent of students who identify as a part of two or more races.

Sports
MGHS sports teams are nicknamed the Silver Eagles and compete in the South division of the Badger Conference. The Silver Eagles American football team won state championships in football in 1977, 1984 and 2013. The boys' swimming team won state titles in 2013, 2015, 2016, 2017 and 2018. MGHS won a state championship in boys' cross country in 1959.

Performing arts
MGHS has two competitive show choirs, the mixed-gender Silver Connection and the girls-only Silver Dimension. The choirs host an annual show choir competition, the Silver Stage Invitational.

Notable alumni
 Richard Nelson (author) (1959), American cultural anthropologist and writer (born: 1 December 1941, died: 4 November 2019).
 Andy North (1968), professional golfer and twice U.S. Open champion, ESPN golf analyst.
 Jeff Skiles (1977), co-pilot of US Airways flight 1549.
 Pete Waite (1977), former University of Wisconsin volleyball coach.
 Jessie Vetter (2004), goalkeeper for the USA women's ice hockey team.
 Gabe Carimi (2006), NFL free agent. His last signed season was in 2014, for the Atlanta Falcons.

References

External links
 

Public high schools in Wisconsin
Schools in Dane County, Wisconsin
Educational institutions established in 1955
1955 establishments in Wisconsin